Pedro Sousa was the defending champion but chose not to defend his title.

Gianluigi Quinzi won the title after defeating Casper Ruud 6–4, 6–1 in the final.

Seeds

Draw

Finals

Top half

Bottom half

External Links
Main Draw
Qualifying Draw

Internazionali di Tennis d'Abruzzo - Singles
Internazionali di Tennis d'Abruzzo